Kingsbury is a surname. Notable people and characters with the surname include:

 Albert Kingsbury (1863–1943), American engineer, inventor and entrepreneur
 Alison Mason Kingsbury (1898–1988), American artist
 Benedict Kingsbury (born 1961), scholar of international law and global governance
 Bobby Kingsbury (born 1980), American baseball player
 Bruce Kingsbury (1918–1942), Australian Victoria Cross recipient
 Clarence Kingsbury (1882–1949), British Olympic cyclist
 Cyrus Kingsbury (1786–1870), American Christian missionary 
 Damien Kingsbury (born 1955), Australian academic
 Donald Kingsbury (born 1929), American–Canadian science fiction writer
 Edward M. Kingsbury (1854–1946), American journalist
 Fred Kingsbury (1927–2011), American Olympic rower
 Gina Kingsbury (born 1981), Canadian ice hockey player
 Gladys Kingsbury (1876–1958), American silent film actress and screenwriter
 Henry Kingsbury (born 1943), pianist and ethnomusicologist
 Howard Kingsbury (1904–1991), American Olympic rower
 Jack Dean Kingsbury (born 1934), American theologian
 Jacob Kingsbury (1756–1837), American army officer
 Jill Kingsbury, fictional character in the New Zealand soap opera Shortland Street
 John James Kingsbury (1853–1939), Australian politician and Crown Prosecutor
 Joseph C. Kingsbury (1812–1898), Mormon pioneer
 Joseph T. Kingsbury (1853–1937), American university president
 Karen Kingsbury (born 1963), American author
 Kathleen Kingsbury, American journalist and editor
 Kyle Kingsbury (born 1982), American mixed martial artist
 Kyle Kingsbury (character), fictional character in the 2007 novel Beastly by Alex Flinn
 Kliff Kingsbury (born 1979), American football player and coach
 Laurie Kingsbury (born 1992), Canadian ice hockey player
 Mikaël Kingsbury (born 1992), Canadian skier
 Noel Kingsbury, British garden designer and writer
 Susan Myra Kingsbury (1870–1949), American economist and social researcher
 Thelma Kingsbury (born ), English–American badminton player
 Tim Kingsbury (born 1977), Canadian musician
 Tom Kingsbury, American businessman
 William W. Kingsbury (1828–1892), American politician

See also
 The Kingsbury family, an influential English family
 Kingsbury (disambiguation)